Mike van Duinen (born 6 November 1991) is a Dutch professional footballer who plays as a striker for Eredivisie club Excelsior.

Career 
Van Duinen formerly played for ADO Den Haag and moved abroad to play for 2. Bundesliga outfit Fortuna Düsseldorf in 2015. After an unsuccessful spell, they loaned him to Roda JC for the remainder of the 2015-16 season. He joined Excelsior in the summer of 2016. After two seasons, he signed a three-year deal with Zwolle.

On 10 July 2021, Greek Super League club OFI announced the signing of Mike van Duinen, on a three-year contract.

On 19 August 2022, van Duinen returned to Excelsior and signed a three-year deal.

Career statistics

References

External links
 
 
 Voetbal International profile  

1989 births
Living people
Footballers from The Hague
Dutch footballers
Association football forwards
ADO Den Haag players
Fortuna Düsseldorf players
Roda JC Kerkrade players
Excelsior Rotterdam players
PEC Zwolle players
Eredivisie players
OFI Crete F.C. players
Super League Greece players
2. Bundesliga players
Dutch expatriate footballers
Expatriate footballers in Germany
Dutch expatriate sportspeople in Germany
Expatriate footballers in Greece
Dutch expatriate sportspeople in Greece